Alec Crikis (22 December 1944 – 10 April 2016) was an Australian sports shooter. He competed in the mixed skeet event at the 1984 Summer Olympics.

References

External links
 

1944 births
2016 deaths
Australian male sport shooters
Olympic shooters of Australia
Shooters at the 1984 Summer Olympics
Place of birth missing
Commonwealth Games medallists in shooting
Commonwealth Games bronze medallists for Australia
Shooters at the 1982 Commonwealth Games
20th-century Australian people
Medallists at the 1982 Commonwealth Games